The 2019 Conference USA men's soccer season was the 25th season of men's varsity soccer in the conference. The season began on August 25 and concluded on November 12.

The defending regular season and tournament champions were Kentucky.

Background

Previous season 

Ahead of the 2018 NCAA Division I men's soccer season, FIU was ranked 20th in the United Soccer Coaches preseason poll. As the season progressed, Kentucky emerged as the one of the strongest teams in the nation, being ranked as high as third in the country. Kentucky finished the season with a program best record of 19–2–1. Kentucky would also go on to win the C-USA regular season, win the 2018 Conference USA Men's Soccer Tournament, and reach the Elite Eight of the 2018 NCAA Division I Men's Soccer Tournament. Additionally, C-USA runners-up, Charlotte earned an at-large bit into the NCAA Tournament. Old Dominion, who had one point been ranked as high as 18th in the nation, were one of the first teams out of the NCAA Tournament bubble.

Head coaching changes 
The New Mexico Lobos men's soccer program was relegated from a varsity to a club sport. Head coach Jeremy Fishbein's contract expired with the termination of the New Mexico varsity program.

Long-time UAB Blazers men's soccer head coach, Mike Getman, retired following the conclusion of the 2018 NCAA Division I men's soccer season. Getman was replaced by Virginia Tech assistant coach, Jeff Kinney.

Head coaches

Preseason

Preseason poll 

The preseason poll was released on August 13, 2019.

Preseason national rankings 
The preseason national rankings will be announced in August 2019. United Soccer Coaches, Soccer America, and TopDrawerSoccer.com do a Top-25 preseason poll. CollegeSoccerNews.com and Hero Sports do a Top-30 preseason poll.

Preseason All-Conference teams 

Preseason All-CUSA Team

Regular season

Positions by round

Rankings

National

Regional - United Soccer Southeast 
The United Soccer Southeast regional rankings contain teams from Conference USA, the Atlantic 10 Conference, Sun Belt Conference, and Missouri Valley Conference.

Postseason

Conference USA Tournament 

The Conference USA Men's Soccer Tournament was held from November 13–16, 2019 on the campus of Old Dominion University. Marshall won their first ever Conference USA Championship, beating Charlotte in the final.

NCAA Tournament

Awards and honors

Players of the Week

Postseason awards

Conference awards

Regional awards

National awards

All-Americans 

To earn "consensus" status, a player must win honors based on a point system computed from the four different all-America teams. The point system consists of three points for first team, two points for second team and one point for third team. No honorable mention or fourth team or lower are used in the computation. The top five totals plus ties are first team and the next five plus ties are second team.

2020 MLS Draft

The 2020 MLS SuperDraft was held in January 2020. Five players from Conference USA were selected.

Homegrown players 

The Homegrown Player Rule is a Major League Soccer program that allows MLS teams to sign local players from their own development academies directly to MLS first team rosters. Before the creation of the rule in 2008, every player entering Major League Soccer had to be assigned through one of the existing MLS player allocation processes, such as the MLS SuperDraft.

To place a player on its homegrown player list, making him eligible to sign as a homegrown player, players must have resided in that club's home territory and participated in the club's youth development system for at least one year. Players can play college soccer and still be eligible to sign a homegrown contract.

No players from Conference USA signed homegrown contracts following the 2019 season ahead of the 2020 MLS season.

References 

 
2019 NCAA Division I men's soccer season